William Keane (January 4, 1899 – June 15, 1949) was an American sailor. He competed in the 8 Metre event at the 1936 Summer Olympics.

References

External links
 

1899 births
1949 deaths
American male sailors (sport)
Olympic sailors of the United States
Sailors at the 1936 Summer Olympics – 8 Metre
Sportspeople from Pittsburgh